Juan Zeledon (born 30 December 1985 Somoto, Madriz)  represented Nicaragua at the 2008 Summer Olympics in the men's 200 metres. He finished ninth in heat 5 with a time of 23.39 seconds. He failed to advance to the second round.

References

Living people
1985 births
Nicaraguan male sprinters
Olympic athletes of Nicaragua
Athletes (track and field) at the 2008 Summer Olympics
People from Madriz Department